DBT may refer to:

 Danish Board of Technology, a technology assessment institution in Denmark
 data build tool (dbt), a data analytics tool
 DBT (gene)
 DBT Online Inc. a US data mining company
 Department for Business and Trade, United Kingdom
 Department of Biotechnology, India
 .dbt, the extension of a DBase file format
 Design-basis tornado within a Design basis accident of a nuclear facility
 Deutscher Bundestag, the lower house of the bicameral parliament of Germany
 Dialectical behavior therapy, a psychotherapy for psychiatric illnesses such as borderline personality disorder
 Dibenzothiophene, a chemical compound
 Dibutyltryptamine, a psychedelic drug
 Digital breast tomosynthesis, a breast X-ray technique
 Direct Benefit Transfer, an anti-poverty program launched by Government of India
 Double-blind trial, a methodology for scientific experiments
 Drive-By Truckers, an alt-country/rock band
 Dynamic Binary Translation, a technique often used by emulator software